Franz König (1905–2004) was an Austrian Cardinal of the Catholic Church.

Franz König may also refer to:

 Franz König (rowing) (born 1927), Austrian coxswain
 Franz König (surgeon) (1832–1910), German surgeon
 Franz Niklaus König (1765–1832), Swiss painter